is a Japanese footballer currently playing as a defender for Tochigi SC.

Career statistics

Club
.

Notes

References

External links

1997 births
Living people
People from Takasaki, Gunma
Sportspeople from Gunma Prefecture
Association football people from Gunma Prefecture
Sanno Institute of Management alumni
Japanese footballers
Association football defenders
J3 League players
Fukushima United FC players
Montedio Yamagata players

Tochigi SC players